Otto Koivula (born 1 September 1998) is a Finnish professional ice hockey forward for the  New York Islanders of the National Hockey League (NHL).

Playing career
Koivula began playing within the youth hockey program of Ilves Tampere. After two seasons of Junior A SM-liiga, Koivula secured  a two-year Liiga contract with Ilves on 30 March 2016.

Koivula was selected in the fourth round, 120th overall, in the 2016 NHL Entry Draft by the New York Islanders.

After his second full season in the Liiga in 2017–18, Koivula signed a three-year, entry-level contract with the New York Islanders on 21 March 2018.

In his first season in North America, the Bridgeport Sound Tigers developed Koivula to play center, rather than his natural wing position. He responded with a strong season in a new position, scoring 21 goals and 25 assists for 46 points in 69 games. He received his first NHL call-up on 30 October 2019. Otto played his first NHL game on 16 November 2019, in Philadelphia against the Flyers.

On 9 October 2020, Koivula was loaned to HIFK due to the delayed start of the North American season due to the COVID-19 pandemic. On 20 September 2021, Koivula was re-signed to a one-year contract by the Islanders. On October 6, 2021, he was placed on waivers.

Career statistics

Regular season and playoffs

International

Awards and honours

References

External links
 

1998 births
Living people
Bridgeport Islanders players
Bridgeport Sound Tigers players
Finnish ice hockey forwards
HIFK (ice hockey) players
Ilves players
New York Islanders draft picks
New York Islanders players
People from Nokia, Finland
Sportspeople from Pirkanmaa